The original North American area codes were established by the American Telephone and Telegraph Company (AT&T) in 1947, following the demonstration of regional Operator Toll Dialing during the World War II period. The program had the goal of speeding the connecting times for long-distance calling by eliminating intermediary telephone operators. Expanding this technology for national use required a comprehensive and universal, continent-wide telephone numbering plan.

The new numbering plan established a uniform destination addressing and call routing system for all telephone networks in North America which had become an essential public service.  It had the eventual benefit of direct distance dialing (DDD) by telephone subscribers.

The initial Nationwide Numbering Plan of 1947 established eighty-six numbering plan areas (NPAs) that principally followed existing U.S. state and Canadian provincial boundaries, but fifteen states and provinces were subdivided further. Forty NPAs were mapped to entire states or provinces. Each NPA was identified by a three-digit area code used as a prefix to each local telephone number. The United States received seventy-seven area codes, and Canada nine. The initial system of numbering plan areas and area codes was expanded rapidly in the following decades, and established the North American Numbering Plan (NANP).

History
Early in the 20th century, the American and Canadian telephone industry had established criteria and circuits for sending telephone calls across the vast number of local telephone networks on the continent to permit users to call others in many remote places in both countries. By 1930, this resulted in the establishment of the General Toll Switching Plan, a systematic approach with technical specifications, for routing calls between two major classes of routing centers, Regional Centers and Primary Outlets, as well as thousands of minor interchange points and tributaries. Calls were manually forwarded between centers by long-distance operators who used the method of ringdown to command remote operators to accept calls on behalf of customers. This required long call set-up times with several intermediate operators involved. When placing a call, the originating party would typically have to hang up and be called back by an operator once the call was established.

The introduction of the first Western Electric No. 4 Crossbar Switching System in Philadelphia to commercial service, in August 1943, automated the process of forwarding telephone calls between regional switching centers. For the Bell System this was the first step to let their long-distance operators dial calls directly to potentially far-away telephones. While automatic switching decreased the connection times from up to fifteen minutes to approximately two minutes for calls between far-away locations, each intermediate operator still had to determine special routing codes unique to their location for each call. To make a nationwide dialing network an efficient, practical reality, a uniform nationwide numbering plan was needed so that each telephone on the continent had a unique address that could be used independently from where a call originated. Such methodology is called destination routing.

With this goal, AT&T developed a new framework in the early 1940s, called Operator Toll Dialing, which was marked by the first installation of a newly developed toll switching system in Philadelphia in 1943. In 1945, the American Telephone and Telegraph Company declared this effort a major post-war project for the Bell System, and proceeded with periodical communications to the general telecommunication industry via the Dial Interexchange Committee of the United States Independent Telephone Association (USITA), which disseminated the project's progress to its members via industry journals and conference contributions. The planning transitioned to implementation, when Ralph Mabbs presented the results in a talk at the Fiftieth Anniversary Meeting of the Independent Telephone Association, on October 14, 1947.

A fundamental requirement for the success of automated toll dialing was a new telephone numbering plan, which became known as the Nationwide Numbering Plan. This numbering plan initially accounted for seventy-seven area codes in the United States and nine in Canada. With the buildout in technical infrastructure for automated toll dialing, the allocations needed to be changed in many states, adding numerous additional area codes over the following decade. By 1975, the numbering plan was known as the North American Numbering Plan, as efforts were in progress to expand the system beyond the United States and Canada.

Numbering plan requirements
Building a nationwide network in which any telephone could be dialed directly required a systematic numbering system that was easy to understand and communicate. Local telephone numbers varied greatly across the country, from two or three digits in small communities, to seven in the large cities.

By the time the Bell Laboratory engineers reached out in this effort to involve the broader industry bodies in 1945, clear concepts had been developed for Operator Toll Dialing. A crucial requirement was the conversion of all participating telephone networks to a universal numbering plan. In 1947, Ralph Mabbs recalled the specifications for this numbering plan as follows:
A distinctive telephone number for each telephone in the United States and Canada
The minimum number of digits which will provide for growth and new services
Minimum changes in customers' numbers
Minimum changes in local dialing practice
Least cost for equipment changes
Minimum reference by operators to bulletins and route guides to gain speed of service advantages
Provisions for operators to directly reach other operators at distant toll centers

Based on the precedent and experience with the large-city dial systems in the nation, the designers set out to direct all telephone companies in the nation to standardize the local telephone networks in the nation to seven-digit local telephone numbers before they could participate in Operator Toll Dialing. This required no or only a few changes in the nation's largest cities, but in the smaller communities the shorter telephone numbers had to be padded with additional digits in a transparent, easily understandable manner, so that extra digits were not always needed when dialing other local subscribers. By 1955, AT&T disseminated a formal publication of network documentation, specifications, and recommendations to the telephone industry, entitled Notes on Nationwide Dialing.

Central office prefixes
Most automatic dial switching systems were designed since the early 1920s to provide service for up to ten-thousand subscriber lines. Each of these switching systems constituted a local telephone exchange, formally known as a central office. Therefore, each telephone connected to a central office had a unique four-digit line or station number.

In larger communities that required multiple central offices to account for the service need of their population, extra digits were added to the telephone number, preceding the line number. Such extra digits were dialed when calling a telephone connected to another switching system in the same city or in a nearby community, and served as routing codes to those central offices. Central office prefixes had already been used in the cities' dial systems since the 1920s, and were typically dialed by subscribers as the initial letters of the exchange name, but only the largest of cities used three digits or letters. This practice and familiarity was preserved in the initial formulation of the new numbering plan, but was standardized to a format of using two letters and one digit in the prefix, resulting in the format 2L–5N (two letters and five numerals) for the subscriber telephone number.

For most cities, this conversion required the addition of extra digits or letters to the existing central office prefix. For example, the Atlantic City, New Jersey, telephone number 4-5876 was converted to AT4-5876 in the 1950s. Complete replacement of existing prefixes was necessary in the case of conflicts with another office in the state. Duplication of central office names, or an identical mapping of two different names to digits, was not uncommon. In practice, the conversion of the nation to this numbering plan took decades to accomplish and was not complete before the alphanumeric number format was abandoned in the 1960s in favor of all-number calling (ANC).

In addition to the central offices that provided the subscriber lines for each telephone (wire centers), the toll routing system included special switching centers that routed long-distance calls between end offices. Each of these toll centers also received an assignment of a unique three-digit toll office code. To reach another operator in another central office or toll office, an operator dialed only the office code of the destination.

Numbering plan areas
By 1945, initial concepts for a nationwide numbering plan anticipated a division of the continent into between fifty and seventy-five numbering plan areas. For this size of the network, a unique two-digit code for each numbering plan area (NPA) would have been sufficient. However, AT&T wanted to preserve existing dialing practices by only dialing the local number for local calls; it was therefore necessary to distinguish the NPA codes from central office codes automatically by the switching system. Central office codes already could not have the digits 0 and 1 in either of the first two positions, because no letters were mapped to those to represent exchange names. This was the opportunity for distinction, but only when 0 or 1 were used in the second position, because switching systems already suppressed single loop interruption (corresponding to 1) automatically, and 0 was used to reach an operator or long-distance desk.

Therefore, numbering plan area codes, often called just area codes, were defined to have three digits, with the middle digit being 0 or 1. Area codes with the middle digit 0 were assigned to numbering plan areas that comprised an entire state or province, while jurisdictions with multiple numbering plan areas received area codes having 1 as the second digit.

The geographic layout of numbering plan areas across the North American continent was chosen primarily according to national, state, and territorial boundaries in Canada and the United States. While originally considered, no numbering plan area in the United States included more than a single state, but in Canada NPA 902 comprised all three provinces of The Maritimes in the far east. The largest states, and some states with suitable call routing infrastructure were divided into smaller entities, resulting in fifteen states and provinces that were subdivided further, creating 46 NPAs. Forty NPAs were assigned to entire states or provinces.

The original configuration of the North American Numbering Plan assigned eighty-six area codes in October 1947, one each to every numbering plan area.

The territories of the United States, which included Alaska, and Hawaii, did not receive area codes at first, nor did the territories of Canada or Newfoundland and Labrador, which was a British dominion at the time.

Assignment plan

The number of central offices that could be effectively installed in a numbering plan with two letters and one digit for the central office code was expected to be approximately five-hundred, because acceptable names for central offices had to be selected carefully to avoid miscommunication. States or provinces that required this many offices had to be divided into multiple smaller areas. Next to size, another important aspect was the existing infrastructure for call routing, which had developed in preceding decades independently of state or municipal boundaries. Since traffic between numbering plan areas would require special Class-4 toll switching systems, planning the divisions avoided cutting busy toll traffic routes, so that most toll traffic remained within an area, and outgoing traffic from one area would not be tributary to toll offices in an adjacent area. On the other hand, it was already recognized in 1930 that too little granularity in the allocation pattern introduced expensive traffic back-haul requirements, conceivably resulting in congestion of the routes to the centers.

Consideration of several assignment patterns led to the configuration that was publicized as a map in October 1947. The three-digit codes were assigned to numbering plan areas in seemingly random manner, avoiding consecutive, nearly-consecutive, or just very similar codes in neighboring numbering plan areas to avoid customer confusion, even when located in the same jurisdiction. This criterion was not always achieved, however. A 'sweeping' enumeration method had been examined earlier, but was discarded. Thus, it would not have been possible to locate the approximate geographic location of a numbering plan area by its code alone. The plan divided New York into five areas, the most of any state. Illinois, Ohio, Pennsylvania, and Texas were assigned four area codes each, and California, Iowa, and Michigan received three. Eight states and provinces were split into two NPAs.

The pattern of this assignment of area codes is shown in the following tabulation. This method of arrangement, which is known to have been in use at Bell Laboratories, shows clearly that area codes were assigned not entirely in random order, but by filling the table in diagonal manner from the top left corner, containing the low-numbered area codes, toward the center and lower right corner. Such a pattern suggests that the designers intended to maintain the same degree of randomness in digits for the remaining, yet unassigned codes. The first area code (201) was given to the entire state of New Jersey, the state with the highest population density in the nation. Despite its density, the state was not subdivided until about a decade later. In fact, in the group of single-NPA states, having the middle digit 0, all of the low-number codes were assigned to the mid-Atlantic states around New Jersey, i.e. the District of Columbia, Connecticut, Maryland, Delaware, and Rhode Island, all states in the top of the list of states with the highest population densities.

In this table, the assignments of the nine area codes to the Canadian provinces are highlighted by a blue background. The red fields are the NPAs that hosted the Regional Centers for toll-switching established in the General Toll Switching Plan of 1929: New York City (212), Los Angeles (213), Dallas (214), Chicago (312), St. Louis (314), and San Francisco (415) in the multi-NPA states, and in Denver (303) and Atlanta (404) in states with just a single area code each. These NPAs are clustered in the upper left corner, especially in the multiple-NPA table, but area codes 303 and 404 also fit neatly into the corresponding white positions of the N1X table (not Regional Centers), so that the Regional Center formed an almost closed block when ignoring the middle digit.

These assignments of these Regional Centers was complemented by assignments to the toll centers (in orange fields) in Detroit (313), serving the busy toll route to Toronto, and in Philadelphia (215), which had been chosen for the first cut-over into commercial service of a No. 4 Crossbar toll switch in 1943 for regional toll service.

The codes of the forms N00, N10, and N11, where N is 2 through 9, were not available for assignment as area codes at the time, but were reserved as special codes, leaving a total of 136 possible combinations. The series N00 was later used for non-geographic numbers, starting with intrastate toll-free 800 numbers for Inward Wide Area Telephone Service (WATS) in 1965. N10 numbers became teletypewriter exchanges, and N11 were used for special services, such as information and emergency services.

Implementation and expansion
For several years, area codes could only be used for Operator Toll Dialing by long-distance operators on routes between toll offices equipped with trunk code translation equipment. This absent, operators still had to rely on route operators and office-specific trunk codes, or employ the previous method of ringdown forwarding between intermediate operators. For entering the destination codes and telephone numbers into newly designed machine-switching equipment, long-distance operators did not use the slow rotary dials, but a ten-button key set, operating at least twice as fast, which transmitted multi-frequency (MF) tone pulses over regular voice channels to the remote switching centers. Such channels were incapable of transmitting the direct-current pulses of a rotary dial beyond a single link. All existing toll switching offices, many still using direct-control (step-by-step) methods, had to be supplemented with components to permit MF signaling and automatic route selection.

As the implementation of the new numbering plan commenced, and the planning, design, and manufacture of detailed routing infrastructure proceeded, several numbering plan areas were redrawn or added in following years. In 1948, northern Indiana received an extra area code (219) for its Chicago suburbs by splitting area code 317. In 1950, southwest Missouri, with a new toll-center in Joplin, received area code 417, a change that provided more central offices in Kansas City. In 1951, the number of area codes grew to ninety: the State of New York gained area code 516 on Long Island, and Southern California received area code 714, to reduce the numbering plan area of Los Angeles.

In December 1948, AT&T advanced the new long-distance system with the cutover of new crossbar switching systems for toll-dialing in New York and Chicago, which added new technology to the No. 4 Crossbar Switching System, first installed in Philadelphia in 1943. This enabled operators to place calls directly to distant telephones without additional operators en route to some three-hundred cities, and resulted in the handling of about ten percent of all Bell System long-distance calling by Operator Toll Dialing. On average, it took about two minutes for any long-distance call to be completed to its destination. As foreseen and stated in 1949, the target goal for call completion, after full implementation of the system across the nation was one minute.

By 1951, preparations had proceeded for customer trials of direct distance dialing (DDD) from a single location in the country, Englewood, New Jersey, which had received an installation of a No. 5 crossbar switch equipped to handle the dialing of up to eleven digits, had automatic message accounting for billing, and was linked to a toll-class switch with the first commercial transistor circuitry that enabled the system to automatically translate area codes into toll trunk codes.

From the customer dialing experience in the Englewood DDD trials, the Bell Laboratories engineers gained the confidence to predict that customers would use the new numbering plan with a reasonable degree of convenience and accuracy. After the success of these trials, expansion of the numbering plan accelerated with new crossbar systems and four new area codes in 1953, and seven in 1954.  By the end of the decade thirty-one additional area codes had been created over the initial allotment of 1947. to satisfy the post-war surge in demand for telephone service.

While the first customer-dialed call using an area code was made on November 10, 1951, it took nearly fifteen years after the 1947 announcement of the new numbering plan that direct distance dialing was common in most cities. By then, some of the initial criteria for assignment, such as the 0/1 rule for single/multiple NPA assignments in a given state had to be abandoned by new requirements from population shifts and growth of communication services. In 1960, AT&T engineers, estimating that the capacity of the numbering plan would be exhausted by 1975, prepared for the next major step in the evolution of the network by eliminating central office names, and introducing all-number calling (ANC). ANC, once supplemented by interchangeable central office codes in the 1970s, increased the number of central office prefixes possible in each numbering plan area from 540 to an eventual maximum of 792.

See also
List of future North American area codes
List of North American Numbering Plan area codes

References

Telephone numbers in the United States
Telephone numbers in Canada
Area codes in the United States
Area codes in Canada
Telecommunications-related introductions in 1947
Telephony